This is a list of the National Register of Historic Places listings in Jim Wells County, Texas.

This is intended to be a complete list of properties listed on the National Register of Historic Places in Jim Wells County, Texas. There is one property listed on the National Register in the county.

Current listings

The publicly disclosed locations of National Register properties may be seen in a mapping service provided.

|}

See also

National Register of Historic Places listings in Texas
Recorded Texas Historic Landmarks in Jim Wells County

References

External links

Jim Wells County, Texas
Jim Wells County
Buildings and structures in Jim Wells County, Texas